

 Friedrich-Wilhelm "Fritz" Holzhäuer (8 July 1902 – 14 December 1982) was a general in the Wehrmacht during World War II.  He was a recipient of the Knight's Cross of the Iron Cross.

Awards and decorations

 Knight's Cross of the Iron Cross on 6 August 1941 as Major and commander of the III./Panzer-Regiment 29

References

Citations

Bibliography

 

1902 births
1982 deaths
Major generals of the German Army (Wehrmacht)
Recipients of the Knight's Cross of the Iron Cross
People from Schwäbisch Gmünd